Gédéon Larocque (December 21, 1831 – October 23, 1903) was a physician and political figure in Quebec. He represented Chambly in the Legislative Assembly of Quebec from 1871 to 1875 as a Liberal member.

Background and early career
He was born in Chambly, Lower Canada, the son of Édouard Larocque and Louise Daigneau. Larocque was educated at the Collège de Chambly, the Collège de Saint-Hyacinthe and the School of Medicine and Surgery at Montreal. He qualified to practise medicine in 1855 and set up practice in Longueuil. Larocque also taught music and owned a farm at Beaumont. He was married three times: to Félicité Thibault in 1856, to Rosalie-Christine Brauners in 1870 and to Azilda Davignon in 1874.

Mayor of Longueuil and other activities
He was mayor of Longueuil from 1862 to 1870 and was warden of Chambly County for four years. He was an agent for the Northern Railway. Larocque was sergeant-at-arms for the legislative assembly from 1875 to 1902.

Publications
He wrote several instructional booklets on subjects related to agriculture including Culture et préparation du tabac in 1881 and Manuel des engrais, published in 1904.

Death
He died in Montreal at the age of 71 and was buried at Longueuil.

References
 

1831 births
1903 deaths
Quebec Liberal Party MNAs
Mayors of places in Quebec
Mayors of Longueuil